The Dortmund–Enschede railway is an international railway connecting the eastern Ruhr district of Germany to Enschede in the Netherlands, which was built by the Dortmund-Gronau-Enschede Railway Company.

History 
The Dortmund-Gronau-Enschede Railway Company (DGE) began to build its line from Dortmund DGE station (later called Dortmund East station) to the east of the central city. As a result, its line had to cross the original Dortmund–Hamm trunk line of the Cologne-Minden Railway Company (Cöln-Mindener Eisenbahn-Gesellschaft, CME).

The first section to Lünen Nord station was opened on 25 November 1874 for passenger trains; the first goods trains ran a week later. Six months later, the line reached Dulmen, where it crossed the Wanne-Eickel–Hamburg line (also a CME line) to reach Dülmen DGE station (later called Dülmen Ost (east) station), which was located north-west of the CME station.

The other parts of the line were opened at short intervals after each other. It reached Coesfeld on 1 August 1875 and Gronau on 30 September 1875, when the Münster–Enschede line of the Royal Westphalian Railway Company (KWE) was also opened to the station. The last section to Enschede in the Netherlands was built in cooperation with the KWE and opened on 15 October 1875 and subsequently operated jointly.

With the opening of Duisburg–Quakenbrück railway by the Rhenish Railway Company four years later, Coesfeld station became an interchange station. At the beginning of the 20th century, the Empel-Rees–Münster line (the eastern part of which is called the Baumberge Railway) was opened, which also intersected at Coesfelder Station, making it the major railway junction of western Münsterland.

Temporary closure 
The Gronau–Enschede section was closed on 27 September 1981 for passenger and freight services. After lengthy negotiations, the cross-border passenger services were resumed in 2001.

Current situation 
The section from Dortmund to Lünen is double track, electrified and classified as a main line.

The section from Lünen to the border at Gronau is single track, non-electrified and has been classified as a branch line since 2007. This section is operated as part of Deutsche Bahn’s Münster-Westphalia Regional Network, based in Munster.

Operations 
The route is now served hourly by the RB 51 (Westmünsterland-Bahn) Regionalbahn service. Trains pass each other in Lüdinghausen, Coesfeld and Epe. Because of the single-track, services operating in the opposite direction and departing on the symmetry minute delay services by several minutes. RB 50 (Der Lüner) also runs hourly between Dortmund and Lünen towards Münster.

Services on the line were operated from 12 December 2004 until 10 December 2012 by Prignitzer Eisenbahn, operating with modern Bombardier Talent diesel multiple units. Previously services had been operated by DB Regio NRW with class 624 diesel multiple units and DB Regio Westfalen won the most recent contract and has operated it since 11 December 2012.

External links 
 
NRW railway archive of André Joost:
 [strecken/2111.htm Description of line 2111]: Dortmund Ost ↔ Dortmund-Eving
 [strecken/2100.htm Description of line 2100]: Dortmund-Eving ↔ Gronau
 [strecken/2014.htm Description of line 2014]: Gronau ↔ Enschede

References

Railway lines in North Rhine-Westphalia
Railway lines opened in 1874
1874 establishments in Germany
Cross-border railway lines in Germany
Transport in Dortmund
Münster (region)